Martynas Varnas (born 21 January 1997) is a Lithuanian  professional basketball player for Šiauliai of the Lithuanian Basketball League. He was selected to the 2015 FIBA Europe Under-18 Championship All-Tournament Team after winning bronze medals with the Lithuania national team. Following the solid performance in the youth competition, it was reported that Varnas will receive a chance to join Žalgiris Kaunas club in 2015. Varnas, together with his age teammates: Tadas Sedekerskis and Laurynas Birutis, was invited to play in the FIBA's Youth All-Star Game during EuroBasket 2015.

References

External links
 Martynas Varnas at fiba.com
Martynas Varnas at basketnews.lt
Martynas Varnas at LKL.lt

1997 births
Living people
Basketball players from Kaunas
BC Šiauliai players
BC Žalgiris players
Lithuanian men's basketball players
Shooting guards